David Kendziera (born 9 September 1994) is an American Olympic athlete who runs the 400m hurdles and 110m hurdles.

From Mount Prospect, Illinois, he attended Prospect High School and the University of Illinois. Overall he was a 10 time NCAA All-American and 4 time NCAA Championship medalist. Kendzeira finished third at the 2015 NCAA Division I Outdoor Track and Field Championships running 49.56. At the 2017 NCAA Division I Outdoor Track and Field Championships he finished third in the 110m hurdles in a time of 13.59, and 7th in the 400m hurdles. At the 2018 NCAA Division I Outdoor Track and Field Championships he finished second in the 110m hurdles, and third in the 400m hurdles.

At the 2019 Meeting de Paris he finished sixth in the 400m hurdles in a time of 49.16. At the 2019 Prefontaine Classic he finished fourth in the 400m hurdles in a time of 49.46. In Minsk, Belarus in September 2019 he won the 400m hurdles in The Match Europe v USA.

On September 17, 2020, in the Stadio Olimpico in Rome Kendziera ran 49.35 placing him in the top ten for the year worldwide.

On June 26, 2021, the Mount Prospect, IL  native qualified for the Tokyo Olympics in the 400m hurdles after setting a personal record of 48.38 seconds and placing third in the finals at the US Olympic Trials. 

On July 29, 2021, Kendziera placed fourth in the 400m hurdles quarterfinals in the Tokyo Olympics and qualified for the semi finals.

References

External links 
 
 
 
 
 

1994 births
Living people
American male hurdlers
Illinois Fighting Illini men's track and field athletes
Athletes (track and field) at the 2020 Summer Olympics
Olympic track and field athletes of the United States